Morfeo Open-Source Software Community is a group that promotes the use of open source software, focused on improving technical transfer between companies, and on generating social networks for collaboration, and to encourage for small-sized companies providing certain resources for carrying out this task.

The group is backed by the regional governments of Andalusia, Aragon, Castile-La Mancha, Extremadura, Catalonia and Valencia. It relies on its members' contributions, and Telefónica I+D releases proprietary software components and provides resources for the group.

The organization works with projects including MyMobileWeb, SMARTFlow (a workflow platform), CORBA Components and service-oriented architecture (SOA) components. Other projects include B2Booking, EasyConf, MyMobileSearch and UptaZone.

References

External links 
 Morfeo Open-Source Software Community
 WIKI:Morfeo Open-Source Software Community

Free and open-source software organizations